Major Frank Fairbairn Crawford (17 June 1850 – 16 January 1900) was a British Army officer who was killed in the Second Boer War. He also played first-class cricket in two countries – in England for Kent County Cricket Club and Marylebone Cricket Club (MCC) and in South Africa for Natal.

Life and career
Crawford was born at Hastings in Sussex in 1850. He made his first-class debut for Kent during the 1870 season, aged 20, when he appeared against Surrey.

He graduated from the Royal Veterinary College in 1873 and enlisted in the army in the same year, joining the Royal Artillery as a veterinarian. In late 1874 he was posted to India where he remained for several years. His army career restricted his cricketing opportunities, although he featured in two first-class matches for Kent during the 1879 season. In total he played 15 times for Kent and made five appearances for Marylebone Cricket Club (MCC) between 1880 and 1884 as well as appearing for MCC in India and South Africa in non-first-class matches. He captained Kent at times in the early 1870s before the club appointed official captains.

After returning from India, Crawford was stationed in South Africa. He played cricket in South Africa, making his debut for Natal in the 1887 Kimberley Tournament before gong on to play in Natal's five first-class matches during the 1889/90 season, the first matches in which the team had been considered as first-class. By the time of the Second Boer War he had reached the rank of Major. He died of dysentery during the war in January 1900 at the military hospital in Pietermaritzburg and is buried at the Fort Napier cemetery.

Family
Crawford was part of a cricketing family. His older brother John and three nephews, Jack, Reginald, and Vivian, all played first-class cricket, with Jack playing Test cricket for England. His father, Andrew, had played for the Gentlemen of England and the family would, on occasions, produce a team of 11 Crawfords.

He married twice, with his first wife, Marianne Ada Robinson, dying after less than a year of their marriage. He had at least two children with his second wife, Loris Muriel Natalie (later Callingham), who died in the torpedoing of RMS Leinster in 1918, and Ivo Frank Fairbairn, who adopted the surname Fairbairn-Crawford and represented Great Britain in athletics at the 1908 Summer Olympics.

See also
 List of cricketers who were killed during military service

References

External links

1850 births
1900 deaths
British Army personnel of the Second Boer War
British military personnel killed in the Second Boer War
Deaths from dysentery
English cricketers
Kent cricketers
Marylebone Cricket Club cricketers
KwaZulu-Natal cricketers
Sportspeople from Hastings
Royal Artillery officers
Royal Army Veterinary Corps officers
Crawford family